Augusto Oliveira da Silva (born 3 August 1983), or simply Augusto Recife, is a Brazilian football midfielder who currently plays for Tombense.

Honours
Cruzeiro
 Campeonato Mineiro: 2002, 2003, 2004, 2006
 Copa Sul-Minas: 2002
 Copa do Brasil: 2003
 Campeonato Brasileiro Série A: 2003

 Internacional
 Campeonato Gaúcho: 2005

 Paysandu
 Campeonato Paraense: 2016, 2017
 Copa Verde: 2016

Contract
ABC July 20, 2009, to November 31, 2007

External links
 Augusto Recife at Guardian's Stats Centre
Augusto Recife at Sambafoot
Augusto Recife at Globoesporte 

Augusto Recife at ZeroZero

1983 births
Living people
Sportspeople from Pernambuco
Brazilian footballers
Cruzeiro Esporte Clube players
Sport Club Internacional players
CR Flamengo footballers
Santa Cruz Futebol Clube players
Ipatinga Futebol Clube players
Clube Náutico Capibaribe players
Botafogo Futebol Clube (SP) players
ABC Futebol Clube players
Associação Desportiva São Caetano players
Joinville Esporte Clube players
Paysandu Sport Club players
Tombense Futebol Clube players
Parauapebas Futebol Clube players
Campeonato Brasileiro Série B players
Campeonato Brasileiro Série C players
Association football midfielders